For The Revolution  is the fifth full-length studio album by the Finnish melodic death metal band Kalmah.  The album reached #17 on the Finnish national album chart.

Artwork
The cover artwork was designed by Vesa Ranta.

Track listing

References

Kalmah albums
2008 albums